The 2012 Pendle Borough Council election took place on 3 May 2012 to elect members of Pendle Borough Council in Lancashire, England. One third of the council was up for election and the council stayed under no overall control.

After the election, the composition of the council was
Conservative 18
Labour 18
Liberal Democrats 12
British National Party 1

Background
Before the election the Conservatives had 18 seats on the council, Labour 16, the Liberal Democrats 12, British National Party 2 and there was 1 independent. 17 seats were contested, with 2 seats available in Boulsworth after Conservative councillor George Askew resigned his seat on the council. This meant the Conservatives were defending 6 seats, Labour 5, Liberal Democrats 4 and the British National Party 1 seat.

Among those standing down at the election was the Conservative leader of the council, Mile Blomeley from Reedley ward for health reasons,  as well as Conservatives Valerie Langtree from Earby ward and Mike Calvert from Boulsworth ward, independent Glenn Whitaker from Craven ward and Labour's Mohammed Khalid from Walverden ward. As well as candidates from the Conservative, Labour and Liberal Democrat parties, there were 4 Green party candidates, 3 from the British National Party and 1 each from the Democratic Nationalists, English Democrats and UK Independence Party.

Election result
Labour gained seats in Reedley from the Conservatives and Vivary Bridge from the Liberal Democrats, to move level with the Conservatives on 18 seats each, while the Liberal Democrats remained on 12 seats after taking Craven ward where the only independent had stood down. The only other change saw one of the two British National Party councillors lose his seat to the Conservatives in Marsden ward by 37 votes. Overall turnout at the election was 37.8%.

Joe Cooney was elected as the new leader of the Conservative group on the council, and then became leader of the council, after having only been a councillor for 12 months. This came after the Conservatives and Liberal Democrats agreed a coalition to run the council with 6 Conservatives and 4 Liberal Democrats on the council executive.

Following the election the Conservative Member of parliament for Pendle, Andrew Stephenson, alleged that had been electoral fraud involving postal votes at the council election particularly pointing to the results in Reedley ward over the last two elections. 3 complaints regarding postal votes were investigated by the police, while councillors set up a working group to look at concerns.

Ward results

By-elections between 2012 and 2014

Coates
A by-election took place on 2 May 2013 after the resignation from the council of Liberal Democrat councillor Janine Throup. The seat was held for the Liberal Democrats by Claire Teall by a majority of 196 votes.

Blacko and Higherford
A by-election was held in Blacko and Higherford after Conservative councillor Shelagh Derwent was disqualified from the council after not attending meetings for 6 months. The seat was held for the Conservatives by Noel McEvoy with 370 votes, double the vote of the other 3 candidates.

References

2012 English local elections
2012
2010s in Lancashire